Syeda Badrun Nahar Chowdhury is a Bangladeshi physician and former additional director general of Directorate General of Health Services. She was awarded Independence Day Award in 2012 by the Government of Bangladesh for her contributions to the independence and Bangladesh Liberation War. She provided medical care services to the freedom fighters and repressed women during the Bangladesh War of Independence in 1971.

War of Independence
During the Bangladesh War of Liberation in 1971, Syeda operated in Chandpur and Comilla areas to render medical services to the freedom fighters.

Personal life
Dr. Badrun Nahar Chowdhury is the wife of Freedom fighter Tafazzal Haider Nassu Chowdhury.  Nassu is a former municipal chairman of Hajiganj upazila of Chandpur district. Her home is Dharara Chowdhury house in municipal area.

References

Living people
1950 births
People from Mymensingh District
Recipients of the Independence Day Award